Joseph Dufresne (February 2, 1805 – November 5, 1873) was a Quebec notary and political figure. He was a Conservative member of the House of Commons of Canada representing Montcalm from 1867 to 1871.

He was born in Saint-Paul-de-Lavaltrie, Lower Canada in 1805. He qualified as a notary in 1834 and set up practice in Saint-Jacques-de-l'Achigan, then Saint-Lin, Saint-Alexis and finally Montreal. In 1854, he was elected to the 5th Parliament of the Province of Canada for Montcalm; he was re-elected in 1858 but defeated by Jean-Louis Martin in 1861. When Martin died before taking his seat, Dufresne was elected to the seat in a by-election in February 1862. He was re-elected in 1863 and, in 1867, was elected to the Parliament of Canada in the same riding. He resigned in 1871, when he was appointed sheriff for Saint-Jean County.

He died two years later at Saint-Jean-sur-Richelieu.

References

 

1805 births
1873 deaths
Members of the Legislative Assembly of the Province of Canada from Canada East
Conservative Party of Canada (1867–1942) MPs
Members of the House of Commons of Canada from Quebec